Zakl is a settlement in the Haloze Hills in the Municipality of Podlehnik in eastern Slovenia. The area traditionally belonged to the Styria region. It is now included in the Drava Statistical Region.

The local church, dedicated to Our Lady of Sorrows, is actually in the neighbouring settlement of Stanošina, but is known as the Zakl church. It was built between 1743 and 1773.

References

External links
Zakl on Geopedia

Populated places in the Municipality of Podlehnik